639 Latona is a minor planet orbiting the Sun that was discovered by German astronomer Karl Lohnert on July 19, 1907, at Heidelberg.

Photometric observations of this asteroid at Palmer Divide Observatory in Colorado Springs, Colorado, during 2007 gave a light curve with a period of 6.139 ± 0.002 hours and a brightness variation of 0.08 ± 0.01 in magnitude. This confirms period measurements of about 6.2 hours reported in 1987 and 2001.

This is a member of the dynamic Eos family of asteroids that most likely formed as the result of a collisional breakup of a parent body.

References

External links 
 Lightcurve plot of 639 Latona, Palmer Divide Observatory, B. D. Warner (2007)
 Asteroid Lightcurve Database (LCDB), query form (info )
 Dictionary of Minor Planet Names, Google books
 Asteroids and comets rotation curves, CdR – Observatoire de Genève, Raoul Behrend
 Discovery Circumstances: Numbered Minor Planets (1)-(5000) – Minor Planet Center
 
 

Eos asteroids
Latona
Leto
Latona
S-type asteroids (Tholen)
19070719